Tuao, officially the Municipality of Tuao, is a 1st class municipality in the province of Cagayan, Philippines. According to the 2020 census, it has a population of 63,970 people.

Etymology
When the early Spanish missionaries were busy laying the foundation of a church late in the 16th century at a site about six kilometers from the present town of Tuao, a big bird came circling over them and then alighted on the wooden cross erected to mark the place where the cornerstone was laid. It flapped its wings noisily, cried "battuao, battuao, battuao" and then flew away.

History 

The native laborers in the construction stopped working and refused to continue telling the priests that the site had not been well chosen. They insisted that a party should find out where the bird had flown to.

To humor the pagan natives, one of the priests allowed himself to be led by a party of natives to look for the mysterious bird. To his surprise, they found the bird serenely perched on top of a tall tree on the edge of a wide clearing ideal for a town site. He sent one of the natives to call for the other priests, who, on their arrival, found the place much to their liking. And so the first church of Tuao was constructed on the site where the present edifice now stands.

When the civil authorities founded the town in 1604, the natives insisted that it be called Tuao. Eight years later on May 13, 1612, Tuao was accepted ecclesiastically. Father Miguel de San Jacinto, O.P. gave the town Santos Angeles Custudios (Holy Guardian Angels) as its patron saints.

The early missionaries in Tuao were zealous evangelists and tactful pacifiers of warlike natives. One of them was Father Francisco Capillas, who later became the first martyr in China. The first parish priest, Father Juan B. Cano, O.P. worked patiently with the people.

A late comer, Father Gabriel Serrano, O.P. built a strong brick and mortar church, a rectory (convento) and a fort (cotta) in which the Spaniards and the natives sought refuge every time the town was raided by the Kalingas from the Cordillera ranges. Unfortunately, these priceless monuments to the politicalization and evangelization of Tuao by the Spaniards were destroyed by a strong earthquake on December 29, 1749.

In protest of abuses committed by some Spanish civil petty officials and soldiers, the inhabitants of Tuao and neighboring Malaueg, rose in revolt in 1781 under Magtangaga and Tomas Sinaguingan. The uprising was put down by Capitan Juan Pablo de Orduna.

Tuao became a part of events during World War II as the seat of the successful renaissance government of Governor Marcelo Adduru. The Japanese Forces garrisoned the town when Adduru was captured late in 1943, but Adduru returned shortly after having been freed by his guerilla soldiers early in 1944. Donald Blackburn, "assisted by his intelligence officer Lt. Mariano D. Manawis, from the prominent Daquial family of Tuao; a very bright and forward thinking man who revitalized the intelligence operations for the 11th Infantry;"; staged from Tuao, his guerrilla headquarters, attacks against the Japanese in Tuguegarao.

After the war, the inhabitants work in silent diligence. Most of them used their brawn to make living, they are independent from outside help and are friendly people.

Geography

Barangays
Tuao is politically subdivided into 32 barangays. These barangays are headed by elected officials: Barangay Captain, Barangay Council, whose members are called Barangay Councilors. All are elected every three years.

Climate

Demographics

Economy

Government
Tuao, belonging to the third legislative district of the province of Cagayan, is governed by a mayor designated as its local chief executive and by a municipal council as its legislative body in accordance with the Local Government Code. The mayor, vice mayor, and the councilors are elected directly by the people through an election which is being held every three years.

Education
The Schools Division of Cagayan governs the town's public education system. The division office is a field office of the DepEd in Cagayan Valley region. The office governs the public and private elementary and public and private high schools throughout the municipality.

References

External links
[ Philippine Standard Geographic Code]
Philippine Census Information

Municipalities of Cagayan
Populated places on the Rio Chico de Cagayan